Jo Garey (born 1 May 1974) is an Australian former cricketer.

Garey played for the New South Wales women's cricket team between 1993 and 1998. She played twenty-one domestic limited overs matches, including fifteen Women's National Cricket League games.

Garey played one Test match and six One Day Internationals for the Australia national women's cricket team.

References

External links
 Jo Garey at southernstars.org.au

Living people
1974 births
Australia women Test cricketers
Australia women One Day International cricketers
New South Wales Breakers cricketers